Vanevan is a village in the Vardenis Municipality of the Gegharkunik Province of Armenia, located close to the village of Torfavan. It was founded in 1828 by Armenians. The village was later populated by Azerbaijanis before the exodus of Azerbaijanis from Armenia after the outbreak of the Nagorno-Karabakh conflict. Armenians who were deported from Azerbaijan now live in the village.

Etymology 
The village was previously known as Shafak.

References

External links 
 
 

Populated places in Gegharkunik Province